Johanne Walhorn (born 19 February 1911 in Düsseldorf; died 24 May 1995 in Ischia) was a German lawyer and the third woman in the city of Münster history to be awarded the  for her services to the city.

References

1911 births
1995 deaths
German women lawyers
People from Münster
20th-century German lawyers
Recipients of the Cross of the Order of Merit of the Federal Republic of Germany
20th-century women lawyers
20th-century German women